Delta Galil Industries is an Israeli textile firm headquartered in Tel Aviv, with plants around the world. The owner is Isaac Dabah. Delta Galil Industries had an annual turnover of over $1,079 million (in 2015).

Overview
Delta Galil Industries is a manufacturer and marketer of private label apparel products for men, women and children. The company was established in 1975. It produces men and women's underwear, bras, socks, baby clothing, leisurewear, nightwear; knitted fabrics, elastic ribbons and trimmings.

Delta Galil employs some 10,000 people worldwide.

On 21 October 2021, the company announced that it has filed "F-1" forms with the US Securities and Exchange Commission (SEC) to trade on Nasdaq under the DLTG ticker. The number of shares to be issued and the price of the offering were not yet been decided. It has previously traded there but was delisted in 2008 due to thin trading.

See also
Israeli fashion
Economy of Israel
List of Israeli companies quoted on the Nasdaq
Textile manufacturing

References

External links
An entire generation seeks work, Haaretz

Textile companies of Israel
Companies listed on the Tel Aviv Stock Exchange
Clothing companies of Israel
Manufacturing companies based in Tel Aviv
Israeli companies established in 1975
Manufacturing companies established in 1975